PureSprings Gospel (formerly WellSpring Gospel) is a gospel music record label by gospel artist CeCe Winans. Winans founded the label in 1999 when Pioneer folded and released Alabaster Box as an experimental album and the album did well. Winans appointed Demetrius Stewart to oversee the label.

The label has signed several artists though Winans remains the flagship artist of the label. The label has also ventured into compilation CDs and children releases.

Artists on the Label
 CeCe Winans
 Vicki Yohe
 Marcus Cole
 Marvin Winans  
 Delores "Mom" Winans
 The Born Again Church Choir
 Alvin Love III

Releases

Albums

Videos
CeCe Winans: Live at the Lambs Theater in New York (2000)
CeCe Winans: The Making of "Throne Room" (2003)
CeCe Winans: Live in the Throne Room (2004)

Notes

American record labels
Gospel music record labels